The Cleveland Stars were an American soccer club based in Cleveland, Ohio and a member of the American Soccer League in 1972–73. Before the 1974 season, the name was changed to the Cleveland Cobras.

Overview
The Stars' colors were blue and white. The Cobras' colors were green and gold, though in 1979 they also wore alternate uniforms of gold/black and in 1981 often donned green/white uniforms.
 
The Cobras actively promoted youth soccer. Hundreds of clinics and camps conducted by its players established a solid youth soccer base throughout northeast Ohio — though the club did not play long enough to reap the benefits of the kids growing up to becoming ticket-buying adults. The Cleveland Force (1978–88) and Cleveland Crunch/Force (1989–2005) indoor soccer teams capitalized with good crowds in the Major Indoor Soccer League and National Professional Soccer League.

The Cobras played home games on AstroTurf at George Finnie Stadium on the campus of Baldwin-Wallace College in Berea, Ohio. A few exhibition games were played at Cleveland Stadium. Each season, ownership brought top international clubs to town for "friendly" matches. Among those were the national teams of Poland, Israel and Canada, Cork Hibernians F.C. and Sligo Rovers F.C (Ireland), GKS Tychy and Arka Gdynia (Poland), Beitar Jerusalem F.C. and Hapoel Jerusalem F.C. (Israel), Eintracht Braunschweig and VfB Oldenburg (Germany) and Partizan Belgrade (Serbia).

Management, consisting of local businessmen of moderate wealth who were soccer aficionados, tried to make up for a lack of finances with an abundance of enthusiasm. The club annually brought in numerous players from the largely ethnic Lake Erie Soccer League, which included among its many teams Belgrade United, Canton Hercules, Cleveland Inter, Cleveland Sannitics, Croatian Rebels, Donauschwaben Concordia, German Central Jets, German Kickers, Greek Olympic, Hrvat Knights, Hungarian Hunters, Karadjordje Stars, Latvian Hawks, Lazio Romans, Pan American Bulls, Polish Red Sox, Ukrainian Lions, Umoja Tigers, Warren Hellenics and Zagreb Rams.

Though highly skilled, the melting pot of LESL imports often proved to be as combative as they were competitive, at times failing to put aside their fierce nationalist loyalties. It made it difficult for the Cobras to mesh into a cohesive unit when players would not pass the ball to a new teammate, instead carrying a grudge borne from previous play in the LESL.

The Cobras' long-time general manager was Dr. John P. Gyekenyesi, a native of Hungary who grew up on Cleveland's east side, earned his doctorate at Michigan State University, and has been an aerospace researcher at NASA for more than 35 years. In the Cobras' instance, you really did need a rocket scientist to run the team. Dr. Gyekenyesi had been president of the LESL before joining the Cobras.

Though the club was generally underfinanced, it had future wealth right in its locker room without realizing it in 1980. The 18-year-old son of Cleveland businessman Al Lerner expressed interest in sports and his father figured it would be good for the youngster to start at the bottom. Randy Lerner served as the Cobras' equipment manager, a glorified term for a locker-room assistant who picked up soiled towels and jerseys and did all sorts of mundane tasks. Randy Lerner succeeded his father as chairman of MBNA, owner of the Cleveland Browns of the National Football League, and later became chairman of the Aston Villa Football Club.

After the 1981 season, Cobras ownership sold its ASL rights to a group that moved the club to Atlanta, Georgia as the Georgia Generals.

Year-by-year

Coaches

 Olinto Busetto (1972–74)
 Herbie Haller (1975–77, '81)
 Jackie Mudie (1978)
 Jimmy Melia (1979)
 Bob Ridley (1980)
 Vito Colonna (1981)

Honors
Rookie of the Year
 1973 Doug McMillan
 1980 Walter Schlothauer

Coach of the Year
 1975 Herbie Haller

Notes

Soccer clubs in Cleveland
Defunct soccer clubs in Ohio
American Soccer League (1933–1983) teams
Soccer clubs in Ohio
1981 disestablishments in Ohio
1972 establishments in Ohio
Association football clubs established in 1972
Association football clubs disestablished in 1981